The 1994 U.S. Women's Open was the 49th U.S. Women's Open, held July 21–24 at the Old Course of Indianwood Golf and Country Club in Lake Orion, Michigan, north of Detroit. Patty Sheehan, the 1992 champion, won her second title in three years, one stroke ahead of runner-up Tammie Green, for the fifth of her six major titles. The event was televised by ESPN and ABC Sports.

Sheehan birdied the 16th hole and Green had a chance to force a Monday playoff, but her  birdie putt on the 72nd hole did not fall.

Helen Alfredsson opened with 63 (−8) on the first day to better the single round record at the U.S. Women's Open by two strokes. She also set the record for the first 36 holes at 132 (−10), but carded 153 (+11) on the weekend. She had been as low as 13-under after 43 holes.

Past champions in the field

Made the cut

Source:

Missed the cut

Source:

Round summaries

First round
Thursday, July 21, 1994

Source:

Second round
Friday, July 22, 1994

Source:

Third round
Saturday, July 23, 1994

Source:

Final round
Sunday, July 24, 1994

Source:

References

External links
Golf Observer final leaderboard
U.S. Women's Open Golf Championship

U.S. Women's Open
Golf in Michigan
Sports competitions in Michigan
U.S. Women's Open
U.S. Women's Open
U.S. Women's Open
U.S. Women's Open
Women's sports in Michigan